Béganne is a commune in the Morbihan department in Brittany in northwestern France.

Population
Inhabitants of Béganne are called Bégannais.

See also
Communes of the Morbihan department

References

External links

Official site 

Mayors of Morbihan Association 

Communes of Morbihan